The Omloop der Zuid-West-Vlaamse Bergen was a Belgian post-WW II cycling race organized for the last time in 1975.

The course, between 140 and 200 km, was situated in West Flanders, against the French border. Poperinge was both start and finish place.

The competition's roll of honor includes the successes of Jozef Planckaert and Jean-Pierre Monseré.

Winners

References 

Cycle races in Belgium
1946 establishments in Belgium
Defunct cycling races in Belgium
Recurring sporting events established in 1946
Recurring sporting events disestablished in 1975
1975 disestablishments in Belgium